James White (September 2, 1792 – December 24, 1870) was an American attorney and Democratic politician in the U.S. state of Maine. He served as Maine State Treasurer from 1842 to 1847.

Early life and career
White was born in Chester, New Hampshire to Col. William White and Elizabeth Mitchell. In 1818 he graduated from Dartmouth College and moved to Belfast, Maine to study law.

Political career
White served as Maine State Treasurer from 1842 to 1847 and ran for Congress in 1862 and 1864.

References

1792 births
1870 deaths
Maine Democrats
Maine lawyers
People from Chester, New Hampshire
State treasurers of Maine
19th-century American politicians
People from Belfast, Maine
19th-century American lawyers